is a Japanese table tennis player.

Achievements

ITTF Tours
Women's singles

Women's doubles

Career records
Singles
World Junior Championships: 3rd (2016, 2017).

Doubles
World Junior Championships: 2nd (2016), 3rd (2017).
Asian Junior and Cadet Championships: 2nd (2013).

Team
World Junior Championships: 1st (2016), 2nd (2017).
Asian Championships: 2nd (2017, 2019).
Asian Junior and Cadet Championships: 2nd (2013, 2014, 2015).

References

External links 
 Miyu Kato's ITTF ranking
 List of articles about Miyu Kato provided by the ITTF website

1999 births
Living people
Japanese female table tennis players
Table tennis players at the 2014 Summer Youth Olympics
Table tennis players at the 2018 Asian Games
Asian Games competitors for Japan
People from Musashino, Tokyo
Nippon Paint Mallets players